The Airolite was an English motorcycle manufactured between 1923 and 1924, which featured a 110cc Simplex two-stroke engine.

References

Motorcycle manufacturers of the United Kingdom